David Novacek (born 18 February 1984) is a Czech DJ, producer, and remixer from Sokolov, Czech Republic.

By late 2018, Novacek released "Zenaida" as a part of compilation God Save The Groove Vol. 1 (Presented by Simon Kidzoo) on Kryder imprint Kryteria Records (Spinnin' Records).

On October 20, 2018, Novacek took over the first Kryteria event "God Save The Groove" during Amsterdam Dance Event 2018, alongside Kryder, Benny Benassi and other 16 talented artists and risings stars on the boat party for 600 people.

Releasing worldwide on top labels like Kryteria Records, Spinnin' Records, Sosumi Records, Juicy Music, Armada Music, Enormous Tunes, No Defenition, Sirup Music, PinkStar Records, Pornostar Records.

His tracks are played and supported by Kryder, Axwell, Steve Angello, Robbie Rivera, Bob Sinclar,  The Cube Guys, Gregor Salto,  Federico Scavo, EDX, Sander Kleinenberg,  Croatia Squad, Tom Staar,  Abel Ramos, Daddy’s Groove, Crazibiza and more. He also did official remix for Ron Carroll.

Novacek played alongside and made live sets with Paula P'Cay, Tara McDonald, Crystal Waters, Sam Obernik and Booty Luv.

We Rave You wrote an article about Novacek at the end of the 2018.

In February 2019, Novacek started to play his DJ sets in London, England. Robbie Rivera remixed Novacek's track "Guitarra", released on Riverra's imprint Juicy Music in April 2019.

In 2020 he did an interview for Redbull.cz magazine  and in 2021 was interviewed with spanish magazine Loud Cave. 

In 2021 David started his own imprint for dance music called "Adelante Records"

Singles

2014 
 Friday [5howtime Records]
 MuziCunt [Nivacords Records]
 2am [Nivacords Records]
 30 [Nivacords Records]
 Guitar [Nivacords Records
 Intro [Nivacords Records]
 Everyday In My Life [Nivacords Records]
 More Than Intro [Nivacords Records]
 Viernes [Nivacords Records]
 Just A Day In The Life [Nivacords Records]
 Dot Com [Nivacords Records]
 Fall (with DJ Mario & Mellisa Hollick) [Nivacords Records]
 Underground Tool [Nivacords Records]
 Lupruby [Nivacords Records]

2015 
 La Trompeta [Cablage Records]
 Upgrade [Cablage Records]
 PaWa [Attractive Music]
 Cariño (with Carlos Rey) [TeddyBear Records]

2016 
 This Is House [Vamos Music]
 Velcoro [Tumbata Records]
 Yo [Vamos Music]
 Arena [Disco Balls Records]
 Soumabana (with SaxoKid) [Congos Records]
 Agama [Latin Lovers Records]
 We Are One (with Paula P’Cay) [Muziek Colours LTD]
 Everytime [Check In Recordings]

2017 
 Fake News (with Eric Decks) [Attractive Music]
 Seguir (with Mirko Boni) [Electroscene Records]
 Trash Talk (with Eric Decks) [Latin Lovers Records]
 Hen [Vamos Music]
 Madellin [Area 94 Records]
 Cross The Line (with Paula P’Cay) [Lovely Tunes Records]
 Feel The Love (with Paula P’Cay) [Lovely Tunes Records]

2018 
 La Hermandad [Kaisen Records]
 Melo [HouseU Records]
 Ofrana [HouseU Records]
 Yeah (with Adriana Hranacova) [Spectrum Recordings]
 Yolela [Hotfingers Records]
 El Niño Inmaculado (feat. Martina Camargo) [Sosumi Records
 Discoteq [Sirup Music] [PinkStar Disko]
 Shake Your Body (with DJ Mario) [Yuppies Records]
 Concubina [HouseU Records]
 Untitled [Sirup Music / PinkStar Records]
 Perepe feat. Martina Camargo [Sirup Music / PinkStar Records]
 Zenaida [Kryteria Records / Spinnin' Records]

2019 
 Back Time (with Sharapov) [Which Bottle Records]
 Guitarra (Original Mix) [Juicy Music Records]
 Guitarra (Robbie Rivera & Chriz Samz Remix) [Juicy Music Records]
 Majalama (with Frank-Lo) [Sirup music / PinkStar Records]
 El Profesor (with Mathias D. & Frank-Lo) [HouseU Records]
 Varadero (with Frank-Lo) [No Definition Records]
 Copacabana (with Frank-Lo) [No Definition Records]
 Carnival (with Jon Costa) [HouseU Records]
 Loser Hit (with Incognet) [No Definition]
 Africana (with Dudu Capoeira) [Sirup music / PinkStar Records]
 Mambo (with Morsense) [No Definition]
 Dark Mode [Tactical Records]
 Summer Thing (with Mathias D.) [Whore House]
 Killa (with Mathias D.) [Whore House]
 Roller (with Frank-Lo) [Whore House]
 Anata (Antho Decks) [Sirup music / PinkStar Records]
 Feelings (with Jon Costa & Frank-Lo) [Enormous Tunes]
 Feelings (with Jon Costa & Frank-Lo)  (Leventina & Chris Reece Remix) [Enormous Tunes]
 Give Me More (with Dani Masi feat. Juan Trumpet) [Juicy Music / Armada]

2020 
 Give Me More (with Juan Trumpet) (Robbie Rivera Remix) [Juicy Music / Armada]
 Couldn’t Love You More (with Jan Costa) [Enormous Chills]
 Take it (with Versus feat. Jasmine Knight) [Juicy Music]
 Take it (with Versus feat. Jasmine Knight) (Robbie Rivera Remix)  [Juicy Music]
 Mama Ya Ya (with Jan Costa) [Sirup. Music]
 Latriba (with Mathias D.) [Groove Cartel]
 Pajaro (with Ivan Miranda) [Enormous Tunes]
 Pajaro (with Ivan Miranda) (Leventina Remix) [Enormous Tunes]
 There Was House (with Oster & Reybo) [Tactical Records]
 La Petra (Morsense & Alonso) [Groove Cartel]
 Shakin' (with Mr. Sid) [Sirup. Music]
 La Pluma (with Stevie Krash feat. Martina Camargo) [EGO Music]
 Mali (with Yvvan Back) [Sosumi Records]
 Bonita (with Frank-Lo & Stephan Vegas) [Whore House]
 Anyone Candy (with Yvvan Back) [Houseu Records]
 Rio (with Frank - Lo Feat. Martina Camargo) [Groover Records]
 Anyone Candy (with Yvvan Back) [Houseu Records]
 DGuata (Felipe Espitia Feat. Martina Camargo) [Cartel Recordings]
 I Can Make It (with Yvvan Back & Zetaphunk) [Let There Be House]
 What A Hot Mess (with Tom Case) [Groover Records]
 Como Un Trueno (with Modegroove & Allan Piziano) [Groove Cartel]

2021 
 Love The Way (with Yvvan Back) [Finally Records]
 No Way (with Yvvan Back) [Sosumi Records]
 I Need U (with Yvvan Back) [Groove Basement]
 Take Me Away (with George Cooper) [Let There Be House]
 Rave Me (with Yvvan Back) [Groove Bassment]
 La Subienda (with Fabian Hernandez Dfh & Kuisitambó) [Adelante Records]
 Rueda Al Tambor (with Fabian Hernandez Dfh & Kuisitambó) [Cartel Recordings]
 Be Free (with Mathias D. and Yvvan Back) [Finally Records]
 Águila Del Monte feat. Martina Camargo (incl. Cato Anaya Remix and Morsense Remix) [Terms & Conditions]
 Little Power (with Mairee) [Juicy Music / Armada]

Remixes 
 2015: Isac & Criss Hawk - Et Les Tetes Continuent A Bouger (David Novacek Remix) [Dubphonedzie Records]
 2016: Freaky DJs feat. Diana Gromova - Try (David Novacek Remix) [Alchemist Project Entertainment]
 2016: Ronn Carroll - The Sermon (David Novacek Remix) [Great Stuff Recordings]
 2017: Erick Decks feat. Jason Anousheh - Lovely Day (David Novacek & Erick Decks Latin Groove Remix) [FeetFood Records]
 2017: Mirko Boni - La Luna En Bogota (David Novacek Remix) [Pornostar Records]
 2019: Matt Caseli & David Jimenez feat. Errol Reid - Hold Up Your Light (David Novacek Remix) [No Definition Records]
 2019: Warp Brothers - Phatt Bass (David Novacek Remix) [Dos Or Die Records]
 2020: Oscar D'León - LLorarás (David Novacek & Morsense Remix) [FREE DOWNLOAD]
 2021: Glen Horsborough Feat. Karmina Dai- For The Love (Yvvan Back, David Novacek & Zetaphunk Remix) [Let There Be House]

References

External links
 Official website
 Beatport
 Spotify
 iTunes
 Soundcloud

1984 births
Living people
Czech record producers
Remixers
House musicians
Czech DJs
Electronic dance music DJs